Talking Heads (also known as Brick) is a box set by rock band Talking Heads, containing the band's eight studio albums in DVD-Audio format on DualDiscs with videos and previously unreleased material. Remixed by Jerry Harrison in MLP (aka Advanced Resolution) 5.1 surround sound, Brick is the first DualDisc release of an artist's entire back catalogue. The albums included in Brick are:

Talking Heads: 77, originally released 1977
More Songs About Buildings and Food, originally released 1978
Fear of Music, originally released 1979
Remain in Light, originally released 1980
Speaking in Tongues, originally released 1983
Little Creatures, originally released 1985
True Stories, originally released 1986
Naked, originally released 1988

The first four titles were released separately on January 10, 2006, and the second four on February 14, 2006, in digipacks rather than white jewel cases. All were mastered by Ted Jensen at Sterling Sound, NYC.

In an attempt to frustrate CD ripping, this release includes MediaMax CD-3 on the CD sides. This program, which has been labeled malware by many security experts, infects computers running certain versions of Microsoft Windows (abusing the "AutoRun" feature) and Mac OS, and attempts to disable the optical disc drive if the user attempts to copy the music into files on their computer.

References

External links
Brick page at www.talking-heads.nl

Albums produced by Brian Eno
Albums produced by David Byrne
Albums produced by Jerry Harrison
Albums produced by Steve Lillywhite
Albums produced by Tony Bongiovi
Talking Heads compilation albums
2005 compilation albums
Rhino Records compilation albums
Sire Records compilation albums
Warner Records compilation albums